The 1994 XXX FIBA International Christmas Tournament "Trofeo Raimundo Saporta-Memorial Fernando Martín" was the 30th edition of the FIBA International Christmas Tournament. It took place at Palacio de Deportes de la Comunidad de Madrid, Madrid, Spain, on 24, 25 and 26 December 1994 with the participations of Real Madrid Teka (champions of the 1993–94 Liga ACB), Yugoslavia, Moscow Selection and São Paulo All-Stars.

League stage

Day 1, December 24, 1994

|}

Day 2, December 25, 1994

|}

Day 3, December 26, 1994

|}

Final standings

References

1994–95 in European basketball
1994–95 in Russian basketball
1994–95 in Spanish basketball